The Arizona Cardinals are a professional American football franchise based in Glendale, Arizona. The Cardinals compete in the National Football League as a member club of the league's National Football Conference (NFC) West division. The Cardinals were founded as the Morgan Athletic Club in 1898, and are the oldest continuously run professional football team in the World.

Officially known as the NFL Draft, the event is the NFL's primary mechanism for distributing newly professional players finished with their college football careers to its teams. The draft order is determined based on the previous season's standings; the teams with the worst win–loss records receive the earliest picks. Teams that qualified for the NFL playoffs select after non-qualifiers, and their order depends on how far they advanced. The final two selections in the first round are reserved for the Super Bowl runner-up and champion. Draft picks are tradable, and players or other picks can be acquired with them.

Key

Player selections 
Source:

References

Arizona Cardinals

Draft picks